The second inauguration of Vladimir Putin as the President of Russia took place on Friday, May 7, 2004.

Ceremony

The ceremony was held on the planned scenario and not much different from the previous one.

The countdown of the second four-year presidential term for Vladimir Putin began at noon. With the battle Kremlin chimes he entered the suite of three rooms (St. George's, Alexander's and St. Andrew's). After going through all three halls, the President rose to the podium, where he was met by the Chairman of the Constitutional Court of Russia Valery Zorkin, Chairman of the Federation Council Sergey Mironov and Chairman of the State Duma Boris Gryzlov. 

The ceremony was watched about 1,700 spectators. These were the ministers and governors, deputies and senators, foreign ambassadors and religious leaders, scientists and artists, representatives of Putin's campaign headquarters and journalists. Yeltsin's family at this time, at the inauguration ceremony represented the only wife of the first president of Russia. Chef Yeltsin protocol Vladimir Shevchenko said that "Boris Nikolayevich cold: he had an inflammation of the bronchi, and the doctors strongly advised him not to leave the house."

After taking the oath, he sounded Anthem of Russia and Vladimir Putin went to the door, simultaneously accepting congratulations spectators.

After that, on Ivanovskaya Square the review of troops took place.

Inaugural address

Vladimir Putin's speech:

References

2004 in Moscow
May 2004 events in Russia
Putin 2
Events in Moscow
Ceremonies in Russia
Vladimir Putin